The United Old Road Jets FC is a Kittian association football club based in Basseterre. The team plays their matches at the Warner Park Sporting Complex.

References

External links 
SKNFA Profile

Football clubs in Saint Kitts and Nevis